Aimo Maggi (31 May 1756 – 9 December 1793) was an Italian painter of the  Neoclassic periods, mainly active in his natal city of Brescia.

Adept as a  musician, he dedicated himself to writing and painting. He studied at the University of Bologna. He was a pupil of the landscape painter Agostino Bertelli. In 1794, and hence posthumously, Maggi's biography of Bertelli was published.

References

1756 births
1793 deaths
18th-century Italian painters
Italian male painters
Painters from Brescia
Italian art historians
18th-century Italian male artists